"Fest på Smedstad vest" is a 2012 single by Norwegian band Madcon featuring vocals from Tina & Bettina. It is taken from the Madcon album Contakt that was released on 21 June 2012. The song peaked at number 12 on the Norwegian Singles Chart.

Music video
A music video to accompany the release of "Fest på Smedstad vest" was first released onto YouTube on 17 August 2012 with a total length of three minutes and forty-six seconds. The video was directed by Slaughterhouse.

Track listing

Chart performance

Release history

References

2012 singles
Madcon songs
2012 songs